NGC 5754 is a barred spiral galaxy located 218 million light years away in the constellation Boötes. It is a member of the Arp 297 interacting galaxies group, which consists of NGC 5752, NGC 5753, NGC 5754, NGC 5755. Along with NGC 2718 and UGC 12158, NGC 5754 is often considered a Milky Way-twin.

References

External links
 
 Distance 
 Image NGC 5754
 
 SIMBAD data

Boötes
5754
09505
52686
Interacting galaxies
+07-30-061
Barred spiral galaxies